Mícheal Ó Súilleabháin (21 February 1917 – 4 November 2004) was an Irish writer.

He wrote Where Mountainy Men Have Sown, an account of the Irish War of Independence in County Cork. This appears to be one of the sources for the film The Wind That Shakes the Barley.

References

External links
on the book

Irish male non-fiction writers
1917 births
2004 deaths
20th-century Irish non-fiction writers
21st-century Irish non-fiction writers
People from County Kerry